Iulian Florescu (23 October 1943 – 27 April 2011) was a Romanian ice hockey player. He competed in the men's tournaments at the 1964 Winter Olympics and the 1968 Winter Olympics.

References

External links
 

1943 births
2011 deaths
Ice hockey players at the 1964 Winter Olympics
Ice hockey players at the 1968 Winter Olympics
Olympic ice hockey players of Romania
Sportspeople from Bucharest